North Dakota is a state located in the Midwestern United States. All incorporated communities in North Dakota are considered cities, regardless of population; there are no towns, villages, or hamlets in the state. There are 356 municipalities.

Cities

See also
 North Dakota
 North Dakota statistical areas
 Founding dates of North Dakota incorporated cities
 List of census-designated places in North Dakota

References

North Dakota, List of cities in
Cities